Beshir Abdel Samad   is a former Egyptian footballer. He played club football for Ismaily.

Abdel Samad played for the Egypt national football team at the 1994 African Cup of Nations. He also managed Saudi Arabian club Al-Tai during the 2013–14 season.

References

External links

Living people
Egyptian footballers
1994 African Cup of Nations players
Egyptian football managers
Ismaily SC players
Egyptian Premier League players
Association football midfielders
Year of birth missing (living people)
Egypt international footballers
Al-Wehda Club (Mecca) managers
Al-Ta'ee managers
Expatriate football managers in Saudi Arabia
Egyptian expatriate sportspeople in Saudi Arabia
Saudi Professional League managers
Saudi First Division League managers